Skiathos (and ) is a small Greek island in the northwest Aegean Sea. Skiathos is the westernmost island in the Northern Sporades group, east of the Pelion peninsula in Magnesia on the mainland, and west of the island of Skopelos.

Geography

The coastline is indented with inlets, capes and peninsulas. The southeast and southwest parts have gentler slopes and that is where most settlements and facilities are located.

The main town is Skiathos (pop. 4,883 in 2011), in the eastern part of the island. Other main settlements are Kalyvia (312), Troullos (158), Χanemos (143), Koukounaries (119), and Achladias (118).

The Municipality of Skiathos includes the islets of Tsougria, Tsougriaki, Maragos, Arkos, Troulonisi and Aspronisi. The municipality has an area of 49.898 km2. They are scattered a few kilometres off the southeast coastline and are clearly visible from the town and the beaches. The island of Skopelos is visible from Skiathos with the more distant islands of Euboea and Skyros visible under very clear weather conditions.

The main paved road runs along the southeastern stretch of the island with several narrow dirt roads branching off towards the interior and the northern coast. Farmland exists around the major settlements on the island.

Despite its small size, Skiathos with its many beaches and wooded landscape is a popular tourist destination. It has over 60, mostly sandy, beaches scattered around the  coastline. Some of these are Troulos, Vromolimnos, Koukounaries, Asselinos, Megali Ammos and Mandraki.

Much of the island is wooded with Aleppo Pine and a small Stone Pine forest at the Koukounaries location where there is a lagoon and a popular beach. The island's forests are concentrated on the southwest and northern parts, but the presence of pine trees is prevalent throughout the island.

History

In Ancient times, the island played a minor role during the Persian Wars. In 480 BC, the fleet of the Persian King Xerxes was hit by a storm and was badly damaged on the rocks of the Skiathos coast. Following this the Greek fleet blockaded the adjacent seas to prevent the Persians from invading the mainland and supplying provisions to the army facing the 300 Spartans defending the pass at Thermopylae. The Persian fleet was defeated there at Artemisium and finally destroyed at the Battle of Salamis a year later. Skiathos then became part of the Delian League. The city was destroyed by Philip V of Macedon in 200 BC.

In 1207 the Ghisi brothers captured the island and built the Bourtzi, a small Venetian-styled fortress similar to the Bourtzi in Nafplio, on an islet just out of Skiathos Town, to protect the capital from the pirates. But the Bourtzi was ineffective in protecting the population and in the mid-14th century the inhabitants moved the capital from the ancient site that lay where modern Skiathos Town is to Kastro (the Greek word for castle), located on a high rock, overlooking a steep cliff above the sea at the northernmost part of the island. The island returned to Byzantine control in the 1270s, and remained in Byzantine hands until after the Fall of Constantinople in 1453, when it passed to the Republic of Venice. Like the rest of the Northern Sporades, Skiathos was conquered by the Ottoman admiral Hayreddin Barbarossa in 1538.

In 1704 monks from Athos built the Evangelistria Monastery, which played a part on the Greek War of Independence as a hide-out for Greek rebels. The first flag of Greece was created and hoisted in the Evangelistria Monastery in Skiathos in 1807, where several prominent military leaders (including Theodoros Kolokotronis and Andreas Miaoulis) had gathered for consultation concerning an uprising, and they were sworn to this flag by the local bishop.

After the War of Independence and demise of piracy in the Aegean, Kastro became less important. In 1830s, the island's capital was moved to the original site — where it still remains. Today, the ruins of Kastro are a tourist attraction.

During the 19th century Skiathos became an important shipbuilding centre in the Aegean due to the abundance of pine forests on the island. The pine woods of the island were then almost obliterated. This was brought to a halt though, due to the emergence of steamboats. A small shipwright remains north of Skiathos Town, which still builds traditional Greek caiques.

Transport
There is a regular boat service to the island and the rest of the Sporades islands with departures from Volos and Agios Konstantinos. The boats are operated mainly by Hellenic Seaways using its high-speed Flying Cat vessels as well as conventional ferries.

Skiathos International Airport is at the northeast of the island next to a lagoon and a lowland isthmus separating the island from the peninsula of Lazareta. As of summer 2011, Skiathos airport is served by Olympic Air flights from both Athens and Thessaloniki, while foreign airlines provide charter flights from a range of airports in European countries such as the United Kingdom, France, Austria, the Netherlands, Italy, Cyprus and Scandinavian countries. During the winter 2013/14, work began to expand the airport, with a runway extension and increased hard standing for parked aircraft.

The modern major road runs along the eastern and southern coast. Narrower roads, some paved and some dirt, reach the interior and the northwest coastline. There is regular, and during tourist season, very frequent bus transit from the main town to the Koukounaries beach in the southwest.

There are three bus routes on the island. The core route is from the main town to Koukounaries beach which travels along the south coast of the island. There are in total 26 bus stops and Koukounaries Beach is number 26 and the last stop. This route operates a fleet of five coaches as frequently as five times an hour during the summer peak season throughout the day, but is significantly reduced during the winter. The second route departs from Skiathos Town, to the Monastery of Evangelistria at an hourly daily schedule and the third bus route to Xanemos on the north coast with up to six round trips daily, both operated using mini-buses.

Sites of interest

Sites of interest in the town 
 Church of Panaghia Limnià, built in 1837
 Church of Tris Ieràrches
 Bourtzi Peninsula
 Papadiamantis House - Museum

Sites of interest in the island 
 Holy Monastery of Evangelistria
 Old Monastery of Panaghia Ekonistria
 Old Monastery of Panaghia Kechrià
 Byzantine Church of Christ (in the Castle)

Beaches 
 Koukounaries Beach
 Lalaria
 Banana beach
 Xanemos
 Megali Ammos
 Achladies
 Vromolimnos
 Agia Paraskevi
 Troulos
 Asselinos (Small and great)
 Maratha
 Mandraki
 Limani tou Xerxi 
 Kechria
 Kastro
 Tsougria (island)

In cinema
Skiathos and its neighbour Skopelos were the filming locations of the 2008 film Mamma Mia!.

Notable residents
 Zisis Oikonomou (1911–2005), poet and prose writer
 Alexandros Papadiamantis (1851–1911), writer
 Richard Romanus, actor
 Mitzelos Adonis (1961), Music Composer, Writer, Orchestrator and Guitarist with International Action and Acceptance

Gallery

References

External links

  
 
 

 
Greek city-states
Islands of Thessaly
Landforms of the Sporades
Municipalities of Thessaly
Populated places in the Sporades
Stato da Màr